Cymbalomia is a genus of moths of the family Crambidae.

Species
Cybalomia albilinealis (Hampson, 1896)
Cybalomia arenosalis Rebel, 1912
Cybalomia azzalana Rothschild, 1921
Cybalomia cervinalis Hampson, 1908
Cybalomia fractilinealis (Erschoff, 1874)
Cybalomia gratiosalis Christoph in Romanoff, 1887
Cybalomia gyoti Rebel, 1909
Cybalomia lactealis (Rothschild, 1915)
Cybalomia ledereri Rothschild, 1921
Cybalomia lutosalis Mann, 1862
Cybalomia pentadalis (Lederer, 1855)
Cybalomia simplex Warren & Rothschild, 1905

Former species
Cybalomia simplicealis (Rothschild, 1915)

References
 "Cybalomia Lederer, 1863". Afromoths.

Cybalomiinae
Crambidae genera
Taxa named by Julius Lederer